On 10 June 2014, the Islamic State of Iraq and the Levant (ISIS) killed at least 670 Shia prisoners in an attack on Badush prison. ISIL first separated out  the Sunni inmates before executing the remaining prisoners. 

On 11 March 2017, the Popular Mobilization Forces announced that they had discovered a mass grave containing the remains of 500 prisoners executed by ISIS in the prison. There were 39 Indian construction workers who were executed in the region.

On 13 June 2021, it was reported that Iraqi authorities had removed the remains of 123 people murdered by ISIL during the prison attack from a mass grave to identify them using DNA from relatives.

References

External links
 https://www.iraqbodycount.org/database/incidents/m2817

2014 murders in Iraq
Massacres in 2014
June 2014 crimes in Asia
21st-century mass murder in Iraq
Terrorist incidents in Iraq in 2014
Massacres of the War in Iraq (2013–2017) perpetrated by ISIL
Religiously motivated violence in Iraq
Violence against Shia Muslims in Iraq
Prison massacres